Kelly Township may refer to the following townships in the United States:

 Kelly Township, Union County, Pennsylvania
 Kelly Township, Cooper County, Missouri
 Kelly Township, Warren County, Illinois